Ondrej Dostál (born 5 April 1971 in Bratislava) is a Slovak politician and former journalist, currently serving as member of the National Council in the caucus of Freedom and Solidarity and the chairman of the Civic Conservative Party.

Early life 
Dostál studied Philosophy and Sociology at the Comenius University, graduating in 1997. As a student he worked as a journalist for the Sme newspaper. In late 2000s, Dostál later studied law at a Comenius University campus in Galanta, which was accused of allowing paying students to avoid university admission process and not having proper accreditation. He eventually graduated in 2013.

Political career 
Until 2001,Dostál was a member of the Democratic Party. In 2001, he co-founded the Civic Conservative Party. Since 2012, he has been the chairman of the party. Dostál has been active in regional and Bratislava city politics in 2002-2022.

In 2010, Dostál was elected to the National Council of the list of Most–Híd party. In 2016 and again in 2020, he was elected on the list of Freedom and Solidarity party. Between March and October 2022, he served as a State Secretary at the Ministry of Justice.

References 

Living people
1971 births
Comenius University alumni
Members of the National Council (Slovakia) 2010-2012
Members of the National Council (Slovakia) 2016-2020
Members of the National Council (Slovakia) 2020-present
Politicians from Bratislava
Civic Conservative Party (Slovakia) politicians
Democratic Party (Slovakia, 1989) politicians